Kim So-hee (born January 20, 1995) is a South Korean singer. She is known for being a member of girl group Nature, a contestant of the first season of Produce 101 and a member of the project girl groups C.I.V.A and I.B.I. Kim debuted as a soloist on November 8, 2017, with the EP The Fillette. After a two-year hiatus, Kim left Music Works and joined n.Ch Entertainment in July 2019 - joining their girl group Nature.

Career

2016–2018: Produce 101 and career beginnings
On July 7, 2016, So-hee debuted as a member of CIVA, a project girl group formed in the Mnet mockumentary show The God of Music 2, with a remake of "Why?" by Diva.

On August 18, 2016, So-hee became part of another project girl group, IBI, which consists of eliminated contestants from Produce 101 (season 1) and was managed by Kakao M (formerly LOEN Entertainment).

On April 10, 2017, it was announced that So-hee was one of the cast members in KBS TV reality show Idol Drama Operation Team. The show invited 7 girl group members to create their very own Korean drama series by becoming accredited scriptwriters as well as acting in the series as fictional versions of themselves. The drama they were working on was called Let's Only Walk The Flower Road, an autobiographical drama. The first episode of the drama was broadcast on May 29 via Naver TV Cast, V Live and YouTube before being aired on KBS N and KBS World on June 10. It aired daily for 8 episodes until July 3. Ten days after the end of the drama series, Girls Next Door – the girl group of 7 members made their official debut on Music Bank on July 14, 2017.

On November 8, 2017, So-hee made her official debut as a soloist with extended play The Fillette and its lead single "Sobok Sobok" featuring Yezi of Fiestar.

2019–present: Debut with Nature

On October 8, 2019, she signed an exclusive contract with n.CH Entertainment, and was announced to have joined the girl group Nature.

Role Model

On November 8, 2017, during the interview of the showcase for her mini album The Fillette, So-hee described her admiration for senior female solo artist IU. She said, "My role model is IU. She [has a good] voice, vocal skills, and is all around good at everything, so I have been practicing with her as my role model." She continued, "I want to emulate her innocence, look in her eyes, singing abilities, and steady vocals even when she's dancing on stage."

Discography

Extended plays

Singles

Filmography

Television shows

Awards

References

External links

 
 

1995 births
Living people
Kakao M artists
K-pop singers
South Korean women pop singers
South Korean contemporary R&B singers
South Korean dance musicians
South Korean female idols
Musicians from Busan
Superstar K participants
Produce 101 contestants
21st-century South Korean singers
21st-century South Korean women singers